Arditi is a Swedish martial industrial and neoclassical band. It consists of Henry Möller (Puissance and Leidungr) and Mårten Björkman from black metal bands Algaion and Octinomos. Arditi formed in 1997, deriving their name from the early 20th century Italian special forces unit known as the Arditi. They released their first EP, Unity of Blood in 2002, following it soon after was their first full-length album, Marching on to Victory in 2003. Since then Arditi has released four more full-length albums, Spirit of Sacrifice in 2005, Standards of Triumph in 2006, Omne Ensis Impera in 2008, Leading the Iron Resistance in 2011 as well as three more EPs, including a limited edition split album with Toroidh.

Arditi has collaborated with Swedish black metal band Marduk on the tracks "1651", "Deathmarch" and "Warschau III: Necropolis".

Discography

Albums

EPs and singles

Collaborations

External links 
 Arditi Website
Equilibrium Music Label
Facebook

References 

Swedish industrial music groups
Martial industrial groups